Route 395 is a  long mostly North–South secondary highway in the northwest portion of New Brunswick, Canada.

The route's North-Eastern terminus starts at an intersection in the community of Hazeldean. The road travels south-east to the community of Anfield.  The road continues south to the community of McLaughlin, then Bedford Road before traveling east to the community of Three Brooks.

History

Intersecting routes
None

See also

References

395
395